The women's 100 metres hurdles event at the 1991 Summer Universiade was held at the Don Valley Stadium in Sheffield on 21 July 1991.

Medalists

Results

Heats
Wind:Heat 1: +1.3 m/s, Heat 2: +1.6 m/s, Heat 3: -0.7 m/s

Final

Wind: +1.6 m/s

References

Athletics at the 1991 Summer Universiade
1991